Minuscule 547 (in the Gregory-Aland numbering), δ 157 (in the Soden numbering), is a Greek minuscule manuscript of the New Testament, on parchment. Palaeographically it has been assigned to the 11th century. 
Scrivener labelled it by number 534.

Description 

The codex contains the text of the New Testament (except Book of Revelation) on 348 parchment leaves (size ), with one lacuna (John 16:27-19:40). The text is written in one column per page, 31 lines per page.

The text of the Gospels has also a division according to the Ammonian Sections, (no references to the Eusebian Canons).

The usual arabesque ornaments are in red.

The order of books: Gospels, Acts, Pauline epistles, and Catholic epistles.

Text 

The Greek text of the codex is a representative of the Byzantine text-type. Hermann von Soden included it to the textual family Krx. Aland placed it in Category V.
According to the Claremont Profile Method it represents Kx in Luke 1, Luke 10, and Luke 20. It creates cluster with the codex 147.

The Pericope Adulterae (John 7:53-8:11) is marked with an obelus.

History 

Formerly the manuscript was held in the Karakalou monastery at Athos peninsula. In 1837 Robert Curzon, Lord Zouche, brought this manuscript to England (along with the codices 549-552). The entire collection of Curzon was bequeathed by his daughter in 1917 to the British Museum, where it had been deposited, by his son, since 1876.

The manuscript was added to the list of the New Testament manuscripts by Scrivener (534) and Gregory (547). It was examined by Frederick Henry Ambrose Scrivener, Dean Burgon, and C.R. Gregory.

It is currently housed at the British Library (Add MS 39590) in London.

See also 

 List of New Testament minuscules
 Biblical manuscript
 Textual criticism

References

Further reading 

 S. Emmel, Catalogue of Materials for Writing, Early Writings on Tablets and Stones, rolled and other Manuscripts and Oriental Manuscript Books, in the Library of the Honourable Robert Curzon (London 1849).

External links 

Greek New Testament minuscules
11th-century biblical manuscripts
British Library additional manuscripts